Charles Louis Stanislas Heurteloup (16 February 1793, Paris – 1864) was a French physician. He was the son of military physician Nicolas Heurteloup (1750-1812).

He studied medicine in Paris, where he obtained his degree in 1823. He is credited for making improvements to instruments used in lithotripsy. Among his inventions was a lithotrite known as a percuteur courbe a marteau.

In Paris, he had as antagonists, fellow lithotritists Jean Civiale (1792-1867) and Jean-Jacques-Joseph Leroy d'Etiolles (1798-1860). In 1829, he traveled to England, where he performed the country's first lithotrity. While in London, he published "Principles of lithotrity" (1831).

Heurteloup also invented an "artificial leech", a device used to bleed sensitive regions around the eyes or the temples.

Selected writings 
 "Principles of lithotrity or a Treatise on the art of extracting the stone without incision..."; London : Wittaker, Treacher, and Co., 1831. 
 Lithotripsie : mémoires sur la lithotripsie par percussion, 1833 - Lithotripsy: memoirs of lithotripsy with percussion.
 Rétrécissements de l'urèthre, 1855 - Strictures of the urethra.

References

External links 
 Google Books Principles of lithotrity; or, A treatise on the art of extracting the stone... by Charles Louis S. Heurteloup (Baron)

1793 births
1864 deaths
Physicians from Paris
19th-century French physicians
French urologists